Three-time defending champions Martina Navratilova and Pam Shriver defeated Larisa Savchenko and Natasha Zvereva in a rematch of the previous year's final, 6–3, 6–2 to win the doubles tennis title at the 1989 Virginia Slims Championships. It was Navratilova's twelfth Tour Finals doubles title, and Shriver's ninth.

Seeds

Draw

Draw

References
 Official Results Archive (ITF)
 Official Results Archive (WTA)

Doubles
Doubles